Yoon Ji-on is a South Korean actor. He is best known for his roles in television series such as Be Melodramatic (2019), Memorist (2020), You Are My Spring (2021)  and Tomorrow (2022).

Biography and career
In 2016 he made his debut as an actor. After his debut as an actor, he has appeared in a number of dramas and several films including Monthly Magazine Home, You Are My Spring and Memorist. He appeared in films including Along with the Gods: The Two Worlds, Okay! Madam and Jo Pil-ho: The Dawning Rage.

Filmography

Film

Television series

Web series

Awards and nominations

References

External links
 
 

1990 births
Living people
South Korean male models
21st-century South Korean male actors
South Korean male film actors
South Korean male television actors